Shagun is a Hindi-language 24/7 Wedding Entertainment television channel, owned by Vertent Media Soft. Pvt. Ltd.

References

Hindi-language television channels in India
Television channels and stations established in 2013
Hindi-language television stations
Television stations in Mumbai
2013 establishments in Maharashtra